U.S. Highway 2 (US 2) is an east–west United States Numbered Highway in the state of Montana.

Route description

US 2 is a vital northern corridor for Montana. The road has more of its mileage within Montana than in any other state. It passes through three Indian reservations, comes very close to two others, and skirts the southern border of Glacier National Park. Most of the Montana segment of US 2 runs alongside BNSF Railway's Northern Transcon route.

US 2 passes into Montana  from Troy, a small town. It is also near the lowest point in Montana, where the Kootenai River leaves the state. The first large town the highway comes to is Libby. After this, it meanders south and east toward Kalispell, a city of about 20,000 residents north of Flathead Lake, the largest freshwater lake west of the Mississippi River. From there the highway passes through the southern end of Glacier National Park and follows the Middle Fork of the Flathead River and the BNSF Railway line. After crossing the Continental Divide at Marias Pass west of East Glacier, the highway exits the Rocky Mountains and begins its trek through the northern plains. Just before entering East Glacier, it crosses the boundary of the Blackfeet Nation of northern Montana.

As the highway enters the Great Plains, specifically the northern High Plains, the first town it encounters is Browning, the largest settlement in the Blackfeet Nation. From here to the North Dakota border, the area surrounding the highway and the adjacent railroad is known as the "Hi-Line" to Montanans from the early Great Northern Railway route. The Hi-Line is one of around 50 folk regions in Montana. It next travels through Cut Bank and Shelby, where it meets Interstate 15 (I-15) and becomes the northern border of the area known as the "Golden Triangle", another folk region, in Montana. This area is one of the most agriculturally productive in the country. From Shelby, it hits a string of small towns before it goes on to Havre, near the geographical center of the road in the state and the other northern apex of the Golden Triangle. The highway continues east to Malta, before which it travels through the Fort Belknap Indian Reservation and parallels the Milk River. From Malta, the highway continues on to Glasgow, just north of the Fort Peck Dam, and then into the Fort Peck Indian Reservation. The highway stays within the reservation for much of its remaining length through Montana and parallels the Missouri River east of the dam. On the reservation, it travels through Wolf Point and Poplar and then exits the reservation a short distance before leaving the state. The final town of Bainville is the last major town on the highway as it leaves the state, near the confluence of the Missouri and Yellowstone rivers.

History

The route has remained mostly unchanged from its original routing, except to expand lanes or straighten and widen some narrow sections.

All these former segments are still in use today. The former section from East Glacier to Kiowa is Montana Highway 49 (MT 49).

One former segment of the original 1926 corridor is maintained as a hiking trail, just east of the intersection with MT 56.

At Marias Pass, the Theodore Roosevelt Memorial Monument, a  obelisk patterned after the Washington Monument, was built in 1931 to honor the 25th anniversary of the U.S. Forest Service. It originally stood right in the middle of the highway, with traffic flowing around it. In 1989, it was placed in a rest area/memorial park south of the highway, and the highway at the summit was widened to four lanes to allow slower vehicles to be passed before descending the pass.

Major intersections

References

 Montana
2
Transportation in Lincoln County, Montana
Transportation in Flathead County, Montana
Transportation in Glacier County, Montana
Transportation in Toole County, Montana
Transportation in Liberty County, Montana
Transportation in Hill County, Montana
Transportation in Blaine County, Montana
Transportation in Phillips County, Montana
Transportation in Valley County, Montana
Transportation in Roosevelt County, Montana